Crawfords State Forest is a  state forest in New Kent County, Virginia. It is covered in mixed hardwoods, including bald cypress, tupelo, and loblolly pine.

Crawfords State Forest is owned and maintained by the Virginia Department of Forestry. The forest is open to the public for horseback riding and hiking. Hunting, camping, and motorized vehicles are prohibited. Some uses may require visitors to possess a valid State Forest Use Permit.

See also
 List of Virginia state forests

References

External links
Virginia Department of Forestry: Crawfords State Forest

Virginia state forests
Protected areas of New Kent County, Virginia
1995 establishments in Virginia
Protected areas established in 1995